Slađana Golić (February 12, 1960 in Banja Luka) is a former Yugoslav basketball player who participated at the 1984 and 1988 Summer Olympics.

External links
Profile at sports references

1960 births
Living people
Olympic basketball players of Yugoslavia
Basketball players at the 1984 Summer Olympics
Basketball players at the 1988 Summer Olympics
Olympic silver medalists for Yugoslavia
Olympic medalists in basketball
Yugoslav women's basketball players
Sportspeople from Banja Luka
ŽKK Vršac players
Centers (basketball)
Medalists at the 1988 Summer Olympics
Universiade medalists in basketball
Universiade gold medalists for Yugoslavia
Universiade bronze medalists for Yugoslavia
Medalists at the 1983 Summer Universiade
Medalists at the 1987 Summer Universiade
Bosnia and Herzegovina women's basketball players
Serbs of Bosnia and Herzegovina